Freddy Pharkas: Frontier Pharmacist is a comic Old West adventure computer game created by Al Lowe (of Leisure Suit Larry fame) and Josh Mandel (of Callahan's Crosstime Saloon fame) and published by Sierra On-Line in 1993. It was dubbed "the Blazing Saddles of computer games" by Computer Gaming World.

Gameplay
The game uses Sierra's SCI1.1 engine and features 256-color hand-drawn art, scaling sprites, and a point-and-click interface. Freddy Pharkas ran under both DOS and Windows 3.1. It was released in both floppy disk and CD-ROM versions, the latter having full voiceover speech for all characters. The game's manual is entitled The Modern Day Book of Health and Hygiene, a parody of 19th century medical texts. It contains information necessary for solving prescription puzzles.

As a form of copy protection, the player must concoct prescriptions for Freddy's patients using recipes found in the user's manual. An incorrect prescription will result in the customer returning angrily, but does not end the game.

Plot
In the game, the player takes the role of Freddy Pharkas, an 1880s-era pharmacist in the town of Coarsegold, California which was the location of Sierra's headquarters in 1993. Freddy was once a gunslinger, but sought a new career after his last gunfight, in which "Kenny the Kid" (a reference to the infamous outlaw Billy the Kid) shot off one of his ears. Throughout the town, businesses are either being bought or proprietors are being scared out of town. Someone is obviously trying to take over the entire area, but who? And why? The slimy sheriff, Checkum P. Shift doesn't seem eager to help, so it's up to Freddy to find out the details. The cast includes the town's eccentric old man and story narrator Whittlin' Willy, Srini (Freddy's "Injun" sidekick – actually East Indian), Doc "Dizzy" Gillespie the drunken town doctor, the cafe owner Helen Back, otherwise known as Mom and her stereotypical Chinese chef Hopalong Singh (a reference to Hop Sing, the cook on Bonanza), the crooked banker Phineas (P.H.) Balance, town schoolmarm (and Freddy's love interest) Penelope Primm, and Madame Ovaree, who runs the local brothel. The villain "Kenny the Kid" is a cartoonish version of Sierra's then-president Ken Williams. Madame Ovaree's name is an obvious parody of Madame Bovary and (as evidenced by her occupation) ovaries. Also, there are some anachronisms in the game, such as Srini mentioning him being on Pakistani time, but Pakistan did not exist at the time the game is set, as the region where the country is located was still a part of India at that time, and Pakistan did not become a country until 1947, 67 years after the game's setting.

Freddy must take part in numerous tasks such as mixing the right amount of chemicals to create the requested prescription remedy and lab equipment. He also must deal with various dilemmas taking part in town such as a gas leak aka all the town's horses with explosive flatulence, a snail stampede, a diarrhea epidemic and an abandoned building fire that might spread through the entire town. He must use found objects and pharmaceutical skills to solve these problems.

Eventually, he regains his gunslinger status and apprehends a poker cheater and neutralizes a group of rowdy cowhands with a canister of laughing gas. Soon, he is confronted by Kenny the Kid and in the ensuring duel, has his remaining ear shot off. Assuming that Freddy would soon die of blood loss, Kenny reveals his affiliation with Penelope Primm, the one who was attempting to buy out Coarsegold for the oil rights. Freddy staunches the bleeding and recovers enough strength to enter the schoolhouse, only to find Penelope packing up. Penelope shows her true colors by aiming a Derringer at Freddy and ordering him to drop his gun holsters. Freddy complies, only to grab a slate to block the bullet that Penelope fires. Penelope then responds by throwing her gun at Freddy, knocking him out, and tying him in the basement and setting it on fire. Freddy escapes the basement and confronts Penelope in a sword fight. Freddy prevails but Kenny reappears and realizes Freddy's true identity, only to be killed when Freddy tosses his sharpened silver ear at his throat. Freddy then leaps out of the schoolhouse before it, along with Penelope, is consumed by an explosion from the fire set in the basement. In the game's dénouement, both Whittlin' Willy and the closing song pointedly mention that Penelope's body was never found.

On at least one box containing the CD-ROM version of the game, it states "Meet the Great-Great Grandpappy of Leisure Suit Larry!", referring to Zircon Jim Laffer who makes a (belated) appearance in the game. However, the game's original intent may have instead been to portray Zircon Jim as Leisure Suit Larry's great-great-great uncle.

Voice cast
Cam Clarke as Freddy Pharkas
Lewis Arquette as Whittlin' Willie / P. H. Balance
Bill Bryant as Doc Gillespie
Michael Gough as Kenny the Kid / Salvatore O'Hanrahan
Nicholas Guest as Srini / Hop Singh
Jocko Marcellino as Smithie
Richard Paul as Chester Field / Sheriff Shift
Jan Rabson as Sam Andreas / Wheaton Hall / Zircon Jim Laffer
Neil Ross as The Narrator
Susan Silo as Helen Back / Madame Ovaree
Kath Soucie as Penelope Primm

Development history
Al Lowe has said that he considers Freddy Pharkas one of his funniest games. He gives a good deal of credit to Josh Mandel, who co-wrote the game, as well as some of the songs including the opening and closing ballads. (Mandel was a collaborator on several Sierra games, including the Space Quest series and The Dagger of Amon Ra.)

Mandel had explained in a commentary the reason why there were so many more jokes in the floppy disk version as compared to the CD-ROM version of the game, "I had co-designed, directed, produced, and written the floppy version; there were no plans at all, at the time, to produce a CD version. When sales of the floppy version justified a CD version, I was no longer available to produce and direct it, having by then started on SQ6. Al Lowe was then tapped to do the casting and recording of the CD version, but the game already had so much text in it that, when it came time to record the inventory text, Al just stopped—he was, he said, tired of sitting in the sound studio. As I had written the vast majority of the game's text and dialogue, I pointed out to him that, in the process of cutting roughly 15% of the game's text from the recording, he'd not only left out many jokes, but many clues and hints as well".

Lowe admitted that his goal was to make a comic western game in the vein of Blazing Saddles. Freddy Pharkas definitely contains its share of scatological humor: it may very well hold the distinction of the first computer game in which the player must capture a horse's flatulence in a paper bag.

Reception

Charles Ardai praised the game in Computer Gaming World in 1993, stating that "Freddy Pharkas is the Blazing Saddles of computer games", with better humor and puzzles than the Leisure Suit Larry series and which "can make a jaded player laugh out loud frequently". He wrote that although "satirizing the Wild West is by no means a new idea", the developers "manage to find new jokes to crack and new ways to crack old ones ... never runs out of material", including satires of other computer games, both Sierra's and others'. Game Informer in September 2006 called it one of the best adventure games of all time, and gave it a Retro Review score of 9.0.

According to Al Lowe, Freddy Pharkas "sold well into six figures." However, he noted that the game and Torin's Passage "had a reputation as failures at Sierra". He explained that the game sold over 150,000 after roughly a year, which inspired the team to re-release it on CD-ROM. This new edition "sold well for two years", and drove the game's lifetime sales to 500,000 copies. Lowe remarked, "It turned out to be quite a successful game and probably should've had a sequel, but because it took three years to get those big numbers, Josh had moved on by then and other things had happened, so it fell through the cracks."

In 2011, Adventure Gamers named Freddy Pharkas the 78th-best adventure game ever released.

References

External links
 
 
 
 Freddy Pharkas: Frontier Pharmacist at Al Lowe's personal website
 Freddy Pharkas: Frontier Pharmacist review (Adventure Classic Gaming) with commentary from Josh Mandel

1993 video games
Adventure games
Classic Mac OS games
DOS games
Medical video games
Point-and-click adventure games
ScummVM-supported games
Sierra Entertainment games
Video games scored by Al Lowe
Video games scored by Aubrey Hodges
Video games set in California
Video games set in the United States
Western (genre) video games
Windows games
Video games developed in the United States
Single-player video games